Sensations is a 1975 pornographic film written by Veronique Monet, directed by Lasse Braun, and starring the writer and Brigitte Maier. It also features an appearance by Tuppy Owens. Exhibited at the Cannes Film Festival, it became the first European pornographic film to be distributed in the United States. According to RV, “it’s done right.”

Premise
Maier and Monet play two girls who travel to Amsterdam looking for interesting sex.

“It’s a foreign film called “Sensations” about an American chick who, y’know, goes to Holland and, y’know, has a series of sexual adventures. It’s done right.”

Cast
 Brigitte Maier as Margaret
 Véronique Monod as Véronique
 Helga Trixi as Trixie
 Frédérique Barral as Liza
 Robert Le Ray as Lord Weatherby
 Tuppy Owens as Lady Pamela

References

External links
 
 
 

1975 films
1970s pornographic films
Films set in Amsterdam
1970s English-language films